Megachile brethesi is a species of bee in the family Megachilidae. It was described by Schrottky in 1909.

References

Brethesi
Insects described in 1909